Thomas Hutton was a Canon of Windsor from 1485 to 1487 and successively Archdeacon of Bedford, Archdeacon of Huntingdon and Archdeacon of Lincoln.

Career
He was appointed:
Prebendary of York 1485
Prebendary of Lincoln 1488
Archdeacon of Bedford 1489
Archdeacon of Huntingdon 1494
Archdeacon of Lincoln 1494

He was appointed to the twelfth stall in St George's Chapel, Windsor Castle in 1485, and held the stall until 1487.

Notes 

Canons of Windsor
Archdeacons of Bedford
Archdeacons of Huntingdon
Archdeacons of Lincoln